Below is a list of comics based on the British television series Torchwood.

Publication history
Torchwood Magazine includes a 10-page Torchwood comic strip in each issue; issue 2 did not include the strip. In 2010, publication of Torchwood Magazine ceased. Torchwood comics resumed publication under Titan Comics in 2016 with a new issue published monthly penned by Torchwood's John Barrowman (Captain Jack Harkness) alongside his sister, Carole E. Barrowman. These stories serve as a direct sequel to the Barrowman's previous Torchwood novel, Exodus Code as well as make reference to Big Finish Productions ongoing Torchwood audio series

Comics

Torchwood Magazine (2008–2010)

Online Exclusives
The following titles were released exclusively on UKTV's Watch website between 2009 and 2010 in conjunction with Torchwood Magazine

Titan Comics (2016)

Continuity
 In The Legacy of Torchwood One!, Ianto's fear is a man made of metal, possibly a reference to the Cybermen and his late girlfriend Lisa.
 One of the biker gangs mentioned in Jetsam is "Blaid Drwg" (sic) and a poster in the background in Rift War! Part Four: Dino Crisis says "Bad Wolf".
 When Drew Blayney is possessed by the bike in Jetsam, a picture of The Beast from Doctor Who episodes "The Impossible Planet"/"The Satan Pit" is shown.
 Toshiko runs past a "Jubilee Pizza" restaurant in Rift War! Part One, the pizza chain seen in various episodes of Torchwood and the Doctor Who episode "Dalek". It is named after the Doctor Who audio drama Jubilee, the basis for "Dalek".
 One of the items Jack gives Gwen and Rhys to help look after the Zarsi Baby in Rift War! Part Three: Funhouse is a book of Venusian Lullabies, first mentioned in the Doctor Who serial, The Curse of Peladon.
 In Station Zero, Dana and Gwen mention the Committee, an organisation related to the Big Finish Productions Torchwood audio dramas.

Outside references
 The line "the children of the stones" in Rift War! Part Six: Circles is possibly a reference to the HTV series Children of the Stones, a series about a time rift centred on a circle of stones.

Collected editions
Some of the stories are being collected into a trade paperback:
Rift War (128 pages, June 2009, Titan Books)
The Selkie (96 pages, May 2010, Titan Books)
Torchwood Archives: Volume 1 (112 pages, Jul 2017, Titan Books)
Torchwood Archives: Volume 2 (112 pages, Oct 2017, Titan Books)
World Without End (112 pages, Apr 2017, Titan Books)
Station Zero (112 pages, Sep 2017, Titan Books)
The Culling (112 pages, May 2018, Titan Books)

See also
Doctor Who Magazine
Torchwood Magazine

Notes

References

External links
Exclusive Torchwood Magazine Comic Strip, made by Titan for Watch

Torchwood
Torchwood
Torchwood
Torchwood
Torchwood
Comics